Andrew David Lansley, Baron Lansley,  (born 11 December 1956) is a British Conservative politician who previously served as Secretary of State for Health and Leader of the House of Commons. He was Member of Parliament (MP) for South Cambridgeshire from 1997 to 2015.

Lansley was born in Hornchurch, Essex and studied Politics at the University of Exeter. He worked in the civil service before entering politics. He ran the 1992 general election while at the Conservative Research Department and later was Vice-Chairman of the Conservative Party at the 2001 general election.

Lansley was the Shadow Secretary of State for Health from 2004 until 2010, the Secretary of State for Health from 2010 until 2012, and Leader of the House of Commons from 2012 until 2014. As Health Secretary, Lansley was responsible for the government's controversial Health and Social Care Act 2012. He announced his intention to stand down as an MP in 2015, and was awarded a life peerage in the 2015 Dissolution Honours. After his career in Westminster, Lansley advised corporate clients on healthcare reforms despite David Cameron’s pledge to close the “revolving door” between Whitehall and the private sector.

Early life
Born in Hornchurch, Essex, Lansley was educated at Brentwood School and the University of Exeter, gaining a BA in politics. In 1977 while at Exeter University, Lansley was elected President of the Guild of Students (Student Union), as a Tory Reform Group candidate. His father Thomas worked in a pathology laboratory, and became co-founder of the Council for Professions Supplementary to Medicine and President of the Institute of Medical Laboratory Scientists.

Before entering politics, Lansley had "a promising career in the civil service". Lansley worked for Norman Tebbit for three years as his private secretary at the Department of Trade and Industry. This encompassed the period of the IRA's 1984 Brighton hotel bombing at the Conservative Party Conference in which Tebbit was seriously injured. Lansley and others have been praised by Tebbit for their support at that time.

Lansley went on to become more fully involved in politics. In 1990, he was appointed to run the Conservative Research Department. He ran the Conservative campaign for the 1992 general election, which he describes as one of "his proudest career achievements" He suffered a minor stroke in 1992, initially misdiagnosed as an ear infection, but made a full recovery save for permanently losing his sense of "fine balance".

He was appointed a Commander of the Order of the British Empire (CBE) for political service in the 1996 New Year Honours.

Member of Parliament
Lansley sought to enter parliament and was selected for the South Cambridgeshire seat where he was subsequently elected as an MP in 1997. He immediately joined the House of Commons health select committee.

At the 2001 election, he again took on a strategy role as a Vice-Chairman of the Conservative Party. As part of his duties Shadow Ministers had to clear the timing of their announcements with Lansley. He fitted them into a timetable known as the 'Stalingrid'. The 2001 election was not a success for the Conservative Party and party leader, William Hague, resigned in its wake. Iain Duncan Smith, the new leader, offered Lansley a position after the election but he turned this down and, until Michael Howard became Leader, Lansley was a backbencher.

Lansley was appointed a Privy Counsellor on 13 May 2010.

Shadow Cabinet
After Howard's election as party leader, Lansley soon returned to the Conservative frontbench. He served as the Shadow Secretary of State for Health. In his post he developed policies centred on using choice to improve the National Health Service, and was author of a chapter in Dr Tempest's 2006 book The Future of the NHS.

Cabinet minister
After becoming Prime Minister in May 2010, David Cameron named Lansley as Health Secretary in the Conservative/Liberal Democrat coalition government. A tempestuous two years of proposed health reforms followed.

On 4 September 2012, Lansley was moved to the positions of Lord Privy Seal and Leader of the House of Commons, which he retained until 14 July 2014. He was then replaced by William Hague, following Hague's surprise resignation as Foreign Secretary, and retired from the Cabinet to the back benches, announcing the same day that he would not be seeking re-election to the House of Commons at the next election and would hope to find an international role. In the event, the election came on 7 May 2015, and until his appointment to the House of Lords in October Lansley was out of parliament.

Proposed health reforms

In November 2010, Lansley provoked controversy by factoring into public health related bills representations from fast food companies such as McDonald's, KFC and processed food and drink manufacturers PepsiCo, Kellogg's, Unilever, Mars and Diageo on obesity, diet-related disease and alcohol, said by campaign groups to be the equivalent of handing smoking policy over to the tobacco industry.

In January 2011, Ministers published the Health and Social Care Bill, detailing planned reforms that would pave the way for GP consortia to take over management of the NHS from primary care trusts. Prime minister David Cameron said "fundamental changes" are needed in the NHS. 

But doctors' leaders believed that GPs could simply have taken charge of PCTs instead, and achieved the same results. The reforms were intended to pave the way for groups of GPs to take control of NHS budgets, with the consortia to take charge in 2013 of about 80% of the funding and of planning and buying everything, from community health centres to hospital services. However, some specialist services such as neurosurgery would be provided by a national board.

In a letter to The Times, British Medical Association chairman Hamish Meldrum, Royal College of Nursing chief executive Peter Carter, and the heads of the Unison and Unite unions,  said the speed and scale of the reforms proposed risked undermining the care of patients by putting cost before quality. Criticism of the reforms had been mounting ahead of the publication of the Health and Social Care Bill on 19 January 2011.

Lansley's white paper on the NHS led to him being the subject of an unflattering hip hop track and video written by rapper NxtGen and poet Rob Gee, with the chorus "Andrew Lansley, greedy / Andrew Lansley, tosser / the NHS is not for sale, you grey-haired manky codger". It was picked up as one of the theme tunes to the anti-cuts movement and spawned placards at a March for the Alternative in March 2011. The video, partly paid for by Unison featured NxtGen rapping about Lansley's proposed GP commissioning policy, his part in the parliamentary expenses scandal, and a controversial donation he had received from private health company Care UK. Lansley responded with a statement that he was "impressed that he's managed to get lyrics about GP commissioning into a rap", but stated "We will never privatise the NHS".

Following the widespread criticism, on 4 April 2011, the Government announced a "pause" in the progress of the Health and Social Care Bill to allow the government to 'listen, reflect and improve' on the proposals.

In November 2011, Lansley faced more criticism when he appeared speaking on a video played at NHS patients' bedside in England, the continuous loop video was played to patients as the main free content on the Hospedia system. When asked by Tom Blenkinsop MP, Lansley replied that he received no payment and there was no cost to the taxpayer.

On 13 April 2011, 96 per cent of 497 delegates at the Royal College of Nursing conference backed a motion of no confidence questioning Andrew Lansley's handling of NHS reforms in England. Later that day, Lansley met with 65 nurses at the same conference, and apologised by saying "I am sorry if what I'm setting out to do hasn't communicated itself." 

In May 2012, Lansley appeared at the Royal College of Nursing annual conference where he stated that although "the number of qualified nurses has gone down by nearly 3,000... clinical staffing levels overall have gone up by nearly 4,000". His comments at the conference were met with uproar from nurses and union members in the audience with heckling and some shouting "liar". The Royal College's general secretary, Dr Peter Carter criticised the health secretary's claim as being "nonsense that there's more clinical staff than there was two years ago is just incorrect" and later told the health secretary that currently "There is a great deal of unhappiness" amongst nurses and health care professionals, with a standing ovation from the audience.

On 28 June 2012, doctors meeting at a British Medical Association conference voted in favour of calling for Andrew Lansley's resignation. 

Doctors voted in agreement of a motion stating "This meeting has no confidence in Andrew Lansley, the Secretary of State for Health, and calls for him to resign". In the meeting, Lansley was accused by the BMA of "breaching doctors' trust" over pension agreements, and was accused by Dr Gary Marlowe who tabled the motion that "during the election he (Lansley) misled the public and the profession" regarding the Health and Social Care Bill. Before voting, Marlowe also stated that "The Bill went through a stunning number of amendments and revisions. I believe the most of any Bill. How can we trust someone with such a poor record with our NHS?"

On 4 September 2012, Lansley was moved out of his role as Health Secretary into the position of Lord Privy Seal.

Salt reduction
In 2010 Nutrition policy was transferred to the Department of Health. As Secretary of State for Health, Andrew Lansley was accused by the BMJ of allowing the food industry to stall progress in reducing salt content in food (subsequently restarted in 2014 by Anna Soubry with publication of new targets effective in 2017).

Public behaviour

Suggested conflicts of interest
Until December 2009, Lansley received £134 an hour from a firm of advertisers that represents clients such as Walkers Crisps, McDonald's, Unilever, Mars and Pizza Hut; Private Eye suggests a link between these activities and Lansley's desire to see a more lightly regulated food industry. The same publication suggested a similar link to a Department of Health report on red meat in which the only products listed in the report found to contain suitable amounts of red meat to merit a "Good" rating were a McDonald's Big Mac, and a Peperami (manufactured by Unilever).

While in opposition as health spokesman, Andrew Lansley accepted a donation of £21,000 from John Nash, the chairman of private healthcare provider Care UK and founder of the private equity fund Sovereign Capital, which owns several other private healthcare companies, to help fund his private office, leading to allegations of a conflict of interest. Such companies stand to be the largest beneficiaries of Lansley's bill passed by the Coalition and House of Lords to increase the use of private health providers within the NHS.

As reported February 2011, Lansley's wife advised attendees at a business conference to "establish positive relationships with decision-makers". Although staff members of Low Associates, the PR firm she runs, had food and drug companies among their clients before joining Low Associates, the firm denies it has any clients in the health sector.

Andrew Lansley's wife, Sally Low, is the managing director of Low Associates. Sally Low denies that Low Associates is involved in lobbying and instead describes its activities as provision of "strategic advice" to clients. Low Associates helps people prepare before they give evidence to committees of MPs, and Sally Low has given speeches on improving lobbying skills, in which she said that lobbyists should "establish positive relationships with decision-makers before you need their help". Lobbyist clients of Low Associates personnel have previously worked for a variety of companies including those with an interest in health, such as SmithKline Beecham, Unilever and Procter & Gamble.

Recession
Andrew Lansley wrote a blog entry on the Conservative Party website on 25 November 2008, which claimed the "good things" from a recession included people being able to spend more time with their families. He was later forced to apologise.

Parliamentary expenses
In the Parliamentary expenses scandal in 2009, Lansley was accused of 'flipping', or redesignating, his second home, after claiming for renovation of a rural cottage prior to selling it. It is claimed that he then 'flipped' his second home designation to a London flat, and claimed thousands of pounds for furniture. Lansley responded to the claims by stating that his claims were "within the rules". He owns a Pimlico property, but has claimed over £7000 for hotel stays.

House of Lords
Lansley was created a Life Peer, taking the title Baron Lansley, of Orwell in the County of Cambridgeshire, on 5 October 2015.

Personal life
Lansley married his first wife Marilyn Biggs in 1985 and they had three daughters. They divorced in 2001, and Lansley married Sally Low, with whom he has had a son and a daughter. Lansley's wealth was estimated at £700,000 in 2009.

In April 2018, Lansley revealed that he has stage 3 bowel cancer. He has called for the government to widen the cancer screening programme on the NHS.

References

External links

Profile at the Conservative Party

The Future of the NHS
Debrett's People of Today

|-

|-

|-

|-

|-

1956 births
Alumni of the University of Exeter
Civil servants in the Department of Trade and Industry
Commanders of the Order of the British Empire
Life peers created by Elizabeth II
Conservative Party (UK) life peers
Conservative Party (UK) MPs for English constituencies
Deputy Lieutenants of Cambridgeshire
English Anglicans
English people of Scottish descent
Leaders of the House of Commons of the United Kingdom
Living people
Members of the Privy Council of the United Kingdom
People educated at Brentwood School, Essex
People from Hornchurch
Private secretaries in the British Civil Service
Secretaries of State for Health (UK)
UK MPs 1997–2001
UK MPs 2001–2005
UK MPs 2005–2010
UK MPs 2010–2015